Bruno Ballante (15 April 1906, Tivoli – 25 December 1977) was an Italian football player.

He played 4 seasons (125 games) in the Serie A for A.S. Roma and ACF Fiorentina.

He was the first ever goalkeeper of A.S. Roma when that club was formed.

External links

1906 births
1977 deaths
People from Tivoli, Lazio
Italian footballers
Serie A players
Serie B players
A.S. Roma players
ACF Fiorentina players
Pisa S.C. players
S.S. Alba-Audace Roma players
Association football goalkeepers
Footballers from Lazio
Sportspeople from the Metropolitan City of Rome Capital